Semyonovo (Hämän) is a rural locality (a village) in Bilyalovsky Selsoviet, Baymaksky District, Bashkortostan, Russia. The population was 329 as of 2010. There are 5 streets.

Geography 
Semyonovo is located 69 km north of Baymak (the district's administrative centre) by road. Bilyalovo is the nearest rural locality.

References 

Rural localities in Baymaksky District